The Clambakes Series Volume 1 is the first of three limited edition Live albums by Superchunk known as the Clambakes series. Released in 2002 The Clambakes Series Volume 1 (limited to 1,500 copies) is a handful of acoustic live sets recorded in various record stores across the United States in tour support of the studio album Here's to Shutting Up .

The band was accompanied by Annie Hayden from the band Spent (another Merge Records band) the tour and appears in these tracks.  Tracks 1 - 5 were recorded live at CD Alley in Chapel Hill, North Carolina.  Tracks 6, 7 were recorded live at Crooked Beat in Raleigh, North Carolina.  Tracks 8 - 12 were recorded live at Gate City Noise in Greensboro, North Carolina.  Tracks 13 - 17 were recorded live at various record stores in Seattle, Washington.  Track 18 was recorded live at Good Records in Dallas, Texas.

Track listing
 "Art Class (Song for Yayoi Kusama)"
 "The Cursed Mirror"
 "Late-Century Dream"
 "Low Branches"
 "Rainy Streets"
 "Hello Hawk"
 "Driveway to Driveway"
 "Florida's on Fire"
 "Detroit Has a Skyline"
 "Drool Collection"
 "Sick to Move"
 "Throwing Things"
 "Late-Century Dream"
 "Florida's on Fire"
 "Seed Toss"
 "Art Class"
 "Rainy Streets"
 "The Animal Has Left Its Shell"

2002 albums
Superchunk albums